The 1864 New York state election was held on November 8, 1864, to elect the governor, the lieutenant governor, a Canal Commissioner and an Inspector of State Prisons, as well as all members of the New York State Assembly.

History

The Union state convention - Republicans and War Democrats which supported the Union and Abraham Lincoln's policy during the American Civil War - met on September 7 at Syracuse, New York. A. H. Bailey was Temporary Chairman until the choice of DeWitt C. Littlejohn as Permanent Chairman. Reuben E. Fenton was nominated for governor after an informal vote (Fenton 237 ½, Lyman Tremain 69, John Adams Dix 35 ½). Thomas G. Alvord was nominated for lieutenant governor after an informal vote (Alvord 246, Waldo Hutchins 96 ½, Richard M. Blatchford 19, William H. Robertson 13, James A. Bell 12, Demas Strong 10). The incumbent Canal Commissioner Franklin A. Alberger was re-nominated without formalities. Ex-Prison Inspector David P. Forrest (in office 1860-1862) was nominated again after a large majority was felt halfway through an informal vote.

The Democratic ("Copperheads") state convention met on September 14 and 15 at Albany, New York. Daniel Pratt was chosen Permanent Chairman. Gov. Horatio Seymour and Lt. Gov. David R. Floyd-Jones were re-nominated by acclamation. Jarvis Lord for Canal Commissioner, and David B. McNeil for Prison Inspector, also were nominated by acclamation.

Result
The whole Union ticket was elected in a tight race with less than 8,000 votes majority out of about 730,000.

The incumbents Seymour and Floyd-Jones were defeated. The incumbent Alberger was re-elected.

76 Unionists and 52 Democrats were elected for the session of 1865 to the New York State Assembly.

Notes

Sources
Result in The Tribune Almanac compiled by Horace Greeley of the New York Tribune

See also
New York gubernatorial elections

1864
 
New York